Luc E.H.G. Reychler (Eeklo, born 30 December 1944) is a Belgian social and political scientist.

His work focuses on following themes:
 The architecture of sustainable peacebuilding
 Integral violence analysis
 Behavioral and existential understanding of conflict situations
 The role of time and temperament on conflict and peace dynamics
 Anticipating the consequences of interventions on conflicts and peace dynamics
 Peace Negotiations
 Diplomacy, diplomatic thinking and failing foreign policy
 Intellectual solidarity

Early life and studies
Luc Reychler studied business psychology (magna cum laude) and forensic psychology at the University of Ghent. With a research grant from the Royal Society, he immersed himself in international relations, diplomatic sciences, and strategic – and conflict studies at the London School of Economics and University College London. At the University of Oslo he became acquainted  with – peace research. In Harvard, Luc Reychler specialized in the political psychology of international relations and conflict, and obtained his PhD in 1976 with a thesis on: ‘Patterns of diplomatic thinking: a cross national study of structural and social-psychological determinants’.

Academic career

Luc Reychler became full professor of 'international relations' at the KULeuven. He taught courses on different facets of international behavior: international organization, diplomatic history, Institutions and policies of the United States, theories and methodology of international relations, strategy and means of power, negotiation and mediation, and peace research. He was director of the Center for Peace Research and Strategic Studies (CPRS). Together with colleagues from other faculties, he launched an interfaculty Master in Conflict and Sustainable Peace (MaCSP). The Ma became part of the European network of expertise (EDEN) in Peace and Conflict. Luc Reychler was elected Secretary General of the International Peace Research Association (IPRA) from 2004 to 2008. He  was appointed to the UNESCO chair for Intellectual Solidarity and Sustainable Peace building. To enrich the peace research training with practical experience, he founded a non-profit organization 'Field diplomacy'. Reychler has taught as a guest professor at the Universities of Boston, California, Irvine, Kent, Helsinki, Kyung Hee University in Seoul, ULBruxelles and Antwerp.

Current activities
As emeritus, Luc Reychler uses his newfound academic freedom to (a) update  the research on the architecture of sustainable peacebuilding, (b) shed light on the crucial role of time and the use of time (temporament) in conflict and peace processes, and (c) explore the role of humor in the prevention and resolution of deep-seated and violent conflicts. He chaired the Ethics Committee of the World Taekwondo federation and designed an educational card game, for young Taekwondo athletes in refugee camps, about Olympism, global citizenship and peace. The latest update on sustainable peacebuilding is published in an article 'The architecture of sustainable Peace, Encyclopedia of Violence, Peace and Conflict’, 3rd Edition, 2022, Elsevier.

He lives in Binkom and has a son.

Selected bibliography

 Patterns of diplomatic thinking (1979)
 Directory guide of European security and defense research (1985)
 In search of European security (1986)
 European security beyond the year 2000 (1988)
 Peace research and international conflictmanagement  (1992) D/1992/2785/1
 Een onvoltooid beleid: Belgische buitenlandse en defensiepolitiek (1993)
 The art of conflict prevention (1994)
 Nieuwe muren: overleven in een andere wereld (1994)
 Een wereld veilig voor conflict: handboek voor vredesonderzoek (1995)
 De agressie voorbij: terreindiplomatie (1995)
 Democratic peace-building and conflict prevention: the devil is in the transition (1999)
 Le défi de la paix au Burundi: Théorie et Pratique (1999)
 Peace building: a field guide (2001)
 De volgende genocide (2004)
 Aid for peace: A guide to planning and evaluation for conflict zones (2009)
 RD Congo Pa​ys de l'avenir: Construisons ensemble une paix durable pour un meilleur destin (Positive prospects: Building sustainable peace together) (2010) 
 Time for peace: the essential role of time in conflict and peace processes (2015), Brisbane: University of Queensland Press, Australia
 Luc Reychler: A pioneer in Sustainable Peacebuilding Architecture (2020), Springer, Switzerland.. This book provides a detailed overview of the career, peace thinking and publications of Luc Reychler.

Recent notes
Principles of sustainable peace architecture (2021)

References

External links
 Diplomatic thinking
 Principles of sustainable peace architecture

Belgian political scientists
Belgian social scientists
Harvard University alumni
Academic staff of KU Leuven
Ghent University alumni